Route 14, or Highway 14, can refer to:

International
 Asian Highway 14
 European route E14 
 European route E014

Argentina
 National Route 14

Australia
 Diamantina Developmental Road (Queensland)
 Birdsville Developmental Road (Queensland)
 Sandover Highway
 - SA

Austria
 Rheintal/Walgau Autobahn

Canada
 Alberta Highway 14
 British Columbia Highway 14
 Manitoba Highway 14
 Nova Scotia Trunk 14
 Ontario Highway 14
 Prince Edward Island Route 14
 Saskatchewan Highway 14

Costa Rica
 National Route 14

Czech Republic
 I/14 Highway; Czech: Silnice I/14

Djibouti
  RN-14 (Djibouti)

Guatemala
National Highway 14 (Guatemala)
National Chris Schwartz Highway 14 (Guatemala

India
  National Highway 14 (India)

Indonesia
 Indonesian National Route 14

Iran
 Road 14

Ireland
  N14 road (Ireland)

Italy
 Autostrada A14
 RA 14

Japan
 Japan National Route 14
 Futtsu Tateyama Road
 Keiyō Road
 Tateyama Expressway

Korea, South
 Hamyang–Ulsan Expressway
 National Route 14

Moldova
 M14 highway (Moldova)

New Zealand
 New Zealand State Highway 14

Paraguay
 National Route 14

Romania
 A14 motorway (Romania)

South Africa
N14 road (South Africa)

Ukraine
 Highway M14 (Ukraine)

United Kingdom
 British A14 (Catthorpe-Felixstowe)

United States
 Interstate 14
 U.S. Route 14
 New England Interstate Route 14 (former)
 Alabama State Route 14
 Arkansas Highway 14
 California State Route 14
 County route A14 (California)
 County Route E14 (California)
 County Route G14 (California)
 County Route J14 (California)
 County Route S14 (California)
 Colorado State Highway 14
 Connecticut Route 14
 Delaware Route 14
 Florida State Road 14
 County Road 14 (Madison County, Florida)
 County Road 14 (Taylor County, Florida)
 Georgia State Route 14
 Idaho State Highway 14
 Illinois Route 14
 Indiana State Road 14
 Iowa Highway 14
 K-14 (Kansas highway)
 Kentucky Route 14
 Louisiana Highway 14
 Louisiana State Route 14 (former)
 Maryland Route 14
 Massachusetts Route 14
 M-14 (Michigan highway)
 County Road 14 (Anoka County, Minnesota)
 County Road 14 (Dakota County, Minnesota)
 County Road 14 (Goodhue County, Minnesota)
 County Road 14 (Hennepin County, Minnesota)
 Mississippi Highway 14
 Missouri Route 14
 Nebraska Highway 14
 Nebraska Link 14D (former)
 Nebraska Spur 14B
 Nebraska Spur 14C
 Nebraska Spur 14H
 Nevada State Route 14 (former)
 New Jersey Route 14 (former)
 County Route 14 (Monmouth County, New Jersey)
 New Mexico State Road 14
 New York State Route 14
 County Route 14 (Albany County, New York)
 County Route 14 (Allegany County, New York)
 County Route 14 (Cayuga County, New York)
 County Route 14 (Chemung County, New York)
 County Route 14 (Delaware County, New York)
 County Route 14 (Dutchess County, New York)
 County Route 14 (Genesee County, New York)
 County Route 14 (Greene County, New York)
 County Route 14 (Niagara County, New York)
 County Route 14 (Orange County, New York)
 County Route 14 (Oswego County, New York)
 County Route 14 (Putnam County, New York)
 County Route 14 (Saratoga County, New York)
 County Route 14 (Schoharie County, New York)
 County Route 14 (St. Lawrence County, New York)
 County Route 14 (Steuben County, New York)
 County Route 14 (Suffolk County, New York)
 County Route 14 (Sullivan County, New York)
 County Route 14 (Tioga County, New York)
 North Carolina Highway 14
 North Dakota Highway 14
 Ohio State Route 14
 Oklahoma State Highway 14
 Oregon Route 14 (former)
 Pennsylvania Route 14
 Rhode Island Route 14
 South Carolina Highway 14
 Tennessee State Route 14
 Texas State Highway 14
 Texas State Highway Loop 14
 Farm to Market Road 14
 Urban Road 14 (signed as Farm to Market Road 14)
 Texas Park Road 14
 Utah State Route 14
 Vermont Route 14
 Virginia State Route 14
 State Route 14 (Virginia 1918–1933) (former)
 State Route 14 (Virginia 1933) (former)
 Washington State Route 14
 Primary State Highway 14 (Washington) (former)
 Secondary State Highway 14B (Washington) (former)
 Secondary State Highway 14C (Washington) (former)
 West Virginia Route 14
 Wisconsin Highway 14 (former)
 Wyoming Highway 14

Territories
 Guam Highway 14
 Guam Highway 14B
 Puerto Rico Highway 14
 Puerto Rico Highway 14R

Uruguay
  Route 14 Brigadier Gral. Venancio Flores

See also
 List of A14 roads
 List of highways numbered 14A

References